Dheedhas is a village of Barmer district in Rajasthan, northern India.  Samuja and Dheedas are two villages in Dheedhas Gram Panchayat.The village is located in the Samdari tehsil. There are rivers Sukri and Luni on both sides of the village, Luni flows in the west of the village and Sukri flows in the east.Bajra and wheat bread and vegetables are mainly used in the food of the villagers. Farmer families reside more in the village. Crops are grown by the farmer in the rainy season, there are rivers on both sides of the village,Wells are the main means of irrigation in the village, all three crops are grown by the farmers.

Temples 

 Shri 1008 Shri Hari Ram Ji Maharaj Dham Dheedhas, Samdari
 Shiv Temple Bageshi Dheedhas
 Ram Sarowar (Shiv Temple Dheedhas)

School 

 Govt. Sr Sec. School Dheedhas
 Govt Girls School Dheedhas

Villages in Barmer district